William Rees (8 November 1802 – 8 November 1883), usually known in Wales by his bardic name of Gwilym Hiraethog, was a Welsh poet and author, one of the major figures of Welsh literature during the 19th century.

Gwilym Hiraethog took his pseudonym from his birthplace, a farm on the Hiraethog mountain in Denbighshire. Largely self-educated, he was a polymath, who took an interest in astronomy and political science as well as being a Nonconformist minister and a leading literary figure.

In 1843, he founded the Welsh language journal Yr Amserau ("The Times") in Liverpool. He used the newspaper to campaign for the disestablishment of the Church in Wales. Rees also penned the hymn text of Dyma gariad fel y moroedd (Here is love, vast as the ocean), which was first published in 1847 but strongly associated with the 1904-1905 Welsh revival. His Helyntion Bywyd Hen Deiliwr (Predicaments of an Old Tailor) (1877) was a pioneering attempt to fashion a Welsh-language novel.

Works

Poetry
Emmanuel (1861)
Tŵr Dafydd sef, Salmau Dafydd (1875)  (Metrical Psalms)
Gweithiau Barddonol Gwilym Hiraethog (1855)

Prose
Llythyrau 'Rhen Ffarmwr (1878)

Novels
Aelwyd F'Ewythr Robert (1852)
Helyntion Bywyd Hen Deiliwr (1877)

Drama
Y Dydd Hwnnw

References

D. Ben Rees - The Polymath: Reverend William Rees (Gwilym Hiraethog 1802-1883) (Modern Welsh Publications)
DNB

1802 births
1883 deaths
People from Denbighshire
Welsh-language poets
Welsh novelists
People from Llansannan
19th-century Welsh poets
19th-century Welsh novelists